Sunday Pops Series is a Canadian classical music television miniseries which aired on CBC Television and simulcast on CBC Stereo in 1977.

Premise
Symphony concerts were produced in various Canadian cities: Edmonton, Montreal, Ottawa, Quebec City, Toronto, Vancouver and Winnipeg.

Scheduling
This hour-long series was broadcast on Sundays at 10:00 p.m. from 24 July to 4 September 1977.

References

External links
 

CBC Television original programming
1977 Canadian television series debuts
1977 Canadian television series endings
1970s Canadian music television series